The 2017 Rinnai 250 was the second stock car race of the 2017 NASCAR Xfinity Series season, and the 26th iteration of the event. The race was held on Saturday, March 4, 2017, in Hampton, Georgia at Atlanta Motor Speedway, a 1.54 miles (2.48 km) permanent asphalt quad-oval intermediate speedway. The race took the scheduled 163 laps to complete. At race's end, Kyle Busch, driving for Joe Gibbs Racing, would pull away with the lead at the end of the race to win his 87th career NASCAR Xfinity Series win and his first of the season. To fill out the podium, Brad Keselowski of Team Penske and Kyle Larson of Chip Ganassi Racing would finish second and third, respectively.

Background 

Atlanta Motor Speedway (formerly Atlanta International Raceway) is a track in Hampton, Georgia, 20 miles (32 km) south of Atlanta. It is a 1.54-mile (2.48 km) quad-oval track with a seating capacity of 111,000. It opened in 1960 as a 1.5-mile (2.4 km) standard oval. In 1994, 46 condominiums were built over the northeastern side of the track. In 1997, to standardize the track with Speedway Motorsports' other two 1.5-mile (2.4 km) ovals, the entire track was almost completely rebuilt. The frontstretch and backstretch were swapped, and the configuration of the track was changed from oval to quad-oval. The project made the track one of the fastest on the NASCAR circuit.

Entry list 

 (R) denotes rookie driver.
 (i) denotes driver who is ineligible for series driver points.

Practice

First practice 
The first practice session was held on Friday, March 3, at 10:00 AM EST, and would last for 55 minutes.

Second practice 
The second practice session was held on Friday, March 3, at 1:30 PM EST, and would last for 55 minutes.

Third and final practice 
The third and final practice session, sometimes referred to as Happy Hour, was held on Friday, March 3, at 3:30 PM EST, and would last for 55 minutes.

Qualifying 
Qualifying was held on Saturday, March 4, at 9:15 AM EST. Since Atlanta Motor Speedway is under , the qualifying system was a multi-car system that included three rounds. The first round was 15 minutes, where every driver would be able to set a lap within the 15 minutes. Then, the second round would consist of the fastest 24 cars in Round 1, and drivers would have 10 minutes to set a lap. Round 3 consisted of the fastest 12 drivers from Round 2, and the drivers would have 5 minutes to set a time. Whoever was fastest in Round 3 would win the pole.

Three drivers would fail to qualify: Carl Long, Morgan Shepherd, and Mike Harmon.

Full qualifying results

Race results 
Stage 1 Laps: 40

Stage 2 Laps: 40

Stage 3 Laps: 83

References 

2017 NASCAR Xfinity Series
NASCAR races at Atlanta Motor Speedway
March 2017 sports events in the United States
2017 in sports in Georgia (U.S. state)